For the Summer Olympics, there are 76 venues that have been or will be used for cycling.

References

Venues
 
Cycling
Olympic venues